Gaoligonga is a genus of spiders in the family Mysmenidae. It was first described in 2009 by Miller, Griswold & Yin. , it contains 3 species from China and Vietnam.

References

Mysmenidae
Araneomorphae genera
Spiders of Asia